The Maitland Brown Memorial, also known as Explorers' Monument, is a monument located in Esplanade Park in Fremantle, Western Australia. Brown died on 8 July 1905,  years prior to the unveiling of the monument, and Panter, Harding and Goldwyer  years prior on 13 November 1864. The monument was commissioned by George Julius Brockman who is depicted by one of the five plaques, and the statue of Brown was sculpted by Pietro Porcelli. Because the monument as originally erected is biased, such as by celebrating the colonists "as intrepid pioneers" in contrast to the Aboriginal people that "are condemned as treacherous natives", an additional plaque was added on 9 April 1994 but leaving the original offensive and biased aspects in place.

History 
Panter, Harding and Goldwyer were killed by Aboriginal people while exploring in the Kimberley region of Western Australia.  When the men failed to return, Brown was commissioned to lead the La Grange expedition, which searched for the whereabouts of the missing men. Brown's party found the men speared to death, two of them evidently in their sleep. Shortly afterwards, between six and twenty Aboriginal persons were killed highly controversially even at the time by Brown's party and reported by Brown as a battle brought on by an Aboriginal ambush, but which has often since been characterised as a punitive massacre of Aboriginal people by white settlers. Indeed, the monument itself has plainly called the group of people that conducted the expedition and that it memorialises the "punitive party" for the past  years.

One of the original plaques on the pedestal reads as follows:

Additional plaque 
It has long been held that the monument is a racist work that presented and continues to present a biased interpretation of the events at La Grange because, for example, it celebrates the colonists "as intrepid pioneers" in contrast to the Aboriginal people that "are condemned as treacherous natives". In 1994, an attempt was made to redress this by placing an additional plaque on the monument. The new plaque commemorates all Aboriginal people who died during the invasion of their country, and reads as follows:

See also
 Flying Foam massacre
 Forrest River massacre
 La Grange Bay, Western Australia
 Pinjarra massacre

References

General references

Further reading

External links 

Exploration of Western Australia
Monuments and memorials in Western Australia
Buildings and structures in Fremantle
History of Indigenous Australians
1913 sculptures
Anti-indigenous racism in Australia
1913 establishments in Australia
Race-related controversies in sculpture